"Lady Powers" is a song by Australian singer songwriter, Vera Blue and included on Vera Blue's second studio album, Perennial (2017). A remixed version of the song featuring American hip-hop singer Kodie Shane was released on 2 March 2018 as the album's fourth and final single.

Vera Blue said "Lady Powers" is "about not having to use your sexuality to be respected as a woman and to be able to feel comfortable in your own skin without having to change for someone while knowing who you are, your worth and your strength." adding "It's hard sometimes, especially when you feel vulnerable... As women we all have lady powers, but we shouldn't have to use them to feel wanted or respected. We need to respect ourselves. In doing that, we have true lady powers other than just our bodies."

Kodie Shane said she was "super excited" to be part of a song, saying  "Feminism to me is nothing more and nothing less than the belief in equality for women. I personally feel a responsibility to demonstrate to that we girls have the power to not only gain equality for women but all sectors of society."

The song was promoted with a 'Lady Powers Tour' across Australia in May and June 2018.

"Lady Powers" was certified gold in Australia in 2019.

Music video
The music video for "Lady Powers" was directed by Jesse Heath and released on 22 March 2018. Vera Blue said "It all went well, it was a great day. There was a lot of cool lighting, smoke machines, there were a couple of dancers, as well. There's quite a few powerful moments within the film clip that I'm really excited for people to see and feel. Overall, it was really fun!" Adding "It could have been easy to make an oppositional ’girls vs. boys’ video, but that would have done the song a great disservice. The girls in the video aren't performing for anyone except themselves and that's what makes them so powerful."

Reception
Hayden Davies from Pile Rats said "On Vera Blue's debut album Perennial, "Lady Powers" stood out. With its bouncy, anthemic pop vibe, "Lady Powers" showcased Vera Blue's newfound dance-pop sound at its best, which is probably the reason why she's highlighting the single months later with a new remix featuring Atlanta hip-hop gem Kodie Shane." Sarah Bamford from Student Edge said "'Lady Powers' is one of those tracks that just wriggles its way into your ear and nests there." Fashion Journal called the song "a true feminine anthem." Amplify called the single "a killer".

Track listings
Digital download

Digital download

Digital download / Vinyl Record

Digital download

Digital download

Certifications

Release history

References 

Vera Blue songs
2018 singles
Universal Music Australia singles
2017 songs
Songs with feminist themes
Songs written by Vera Blue